Aston Croall (born 10 July 1984) is an English rugby union player for Harlequins. He usually plays at loosehead prop or hooker. He has represented England at the Under 16, 18, 19 21's and England counties. he was part of the England Under 21 squad that competed in the International Rugby Board Under 21 World Championships in June 2005. In 2010 Croall made the switch to join Sale Sharks. On 10 November 2011 it was announced he was returning to Harlequins for the remainder of the 2011/12 Season as an injury replacement.
Aston went on to play in a number of games that season for harlequins including a Heineken cup match away in Toulon in which he started in the front row as Hooker.
After the end of the season Aston headed back up the M6 to Manchester to see out his 3rd year of his contract.
Aston signed an extension on his contract for 1 more season keeping him at sale sharks until 2014.
During the summer of 2014 Aston signed a contract with National league 1 side Blackheath, where he featured in all but 1 game due to injury. It was during this season that Aston was chosen to play for England Counties, But Also for the invitation team  BARBARIANS FC. Aston finished his playing career at Tonbridge Wells after spending one year with them as player coach, and it was said that he cherished his last moments there on the playing field.

External links
 Harlequins profile
 Profile at ComeAllWithin.co.uk

References

1984 births
Living people
English rugby union players
Harlequin F.C. players
Rugby union players from Kent
Rugby union props